"White Lies" is a song recorded by British-German DJ and record producing duo M-22 featuring vocals from Kabba. The single, which samples portions of Inner City's 1989 song "Good Life," reached number 8 on the Mexico Ingles Airplay in April 2019, and number 5 on Billboard's Dance/Mix Show Airplay Chart in May 2019, their best placement on a US chart to date and eclipsing "First Time," which peaked at number 17 in August 2018.

Track listing

Certifications

References

External links

2019 singles
2019 songs
House music songs
Eurodance songs
Electronic songs
Casablanca Records singles
Republic Records singles
Universal Records singles
Songs written by Andrew Bullimore
Songs written by Kevin Saunderson